Pax Britannica was a period of relative peace in Europe 1815–1914.

Pax Britannica may also refer to:

Pax Britannica, the title of the middle volume of the Pax Britannica Trilogy  by British author Jan Morris
Pax Britannica, the title of a 1949 book by the British writer and commentator F. A. Voigt
Pax Britannica, a novel in the series by Abaddon Books

Pax Britannica, the 1990 Album of the London industrial music group Test Dept

Pax Britannica, a 1985 board wargame by Greg Costikyan
Pax Britannica, a steampunk role-playing game by Abbott Games.
Pax Britannica, a computer real-time strategy game by No Fun Games